John S. Williams may refer to:
 John Sam Williams (born 1966), American basketball player
 John Scott Williams (1893–1944), Canadian air force officer
 John Sharp Williams (1854–1932), US Senator from Mississippi and Minority Leader of the House of Representatives
 John Sibley Williams (born 1978), American poet and fiction writer
 John Skelton Williams (1865–1926), American Comptroller of the Currency
 John Stewart Williams (1911–1964), English cricketer
 John Stuart Williams (1818–1898), American Confederate general and US Senator from Kentucky

See also 
 John Williams (disambiguation)
 John Stewart Williamson (1908–2006), American science fiction writer
 John Suther Williamson ( – 1836), British army officer